Nabil Lamara (born August 15, 1993) is an Algerian footballer who plays as a defender for Club Africain.

References 

Living people
1993 births
Algerian footballers
Association football defenders
MC Alger players
21st-century Algerian people